Karat may refer to:
 Karat, Khuzestan (كرت - Karat)
 Karat, Razavi Khorasan (كرات - Karāt)
 Karat Rural District, in Razavi Khorasan Province